Boronia rubiginosa is a plant in the citrus family Rutaceae and is endemic to New South Wales in Australia. It is a shrub with pinnate leaves that are paler on the lower surface, and up to three pale to bright pink, four-petalled flowers in the leaf axils.

Description
The leaves are pinnate with between three and seven elliptic to spatula-shaped leaflets that are paler on the lower surface. The eight stamens alternate in length with those near the sepals slightly longer than those near the petals.

Taxonomy and naming
Boronia rubiginosa was first named and described by Allan Cunningham but his description was first published in 1837 by Stephan Endlicher in his book Enumeratio plantarum quas in Novae Hollandiae ora austro-occidentali ad fluvium Cygnorum et in sinu Regis Georgii collegit Carolus Liber Baro de Hügel. Cunningham collected the type specimen near the Hunter River The specific epithet (rubiginosa) is a Latin word meaning "rusty".

Distribution and habitat
Boronia rubiginosa grows in dry woodland on sandstone between Berrima and Lees Pinch in the Goulburn River National Park. Boronia ruppii which grows on serpentite in the Barraba area, was previously included in this species.

References 

rubiginosa
Flora of New South Wales
Plants described in 1837
Taxa named by Allan Cunningham (botanist)